756 Lilliana is a minor planet orbiting the Sun that was discovered by American astronomer Joel Hastings Metcalf on 26 April 1908 from Taunton, Massachusetts. It rotates around its axis of rotation every 9.36 hours.

Further study will be needed to resolve the discrepancies in period and amplitude.

References

External links 
 Lightcurve plot of 756 Lilliana, Palmer Divide Observatory, B. D. Warner (2007)
 Asteroid Lightcurve Database (LCDB), query form (info )
 Dictionary of Minor Planet Names, Google books
 Asteroids and comets rotation curves, CdR Observatoire de Genève, Raoul Behrend
 Discovery Circumstances: Numbered Minor Planets (1)–(5000) Minor Planet Center
 
 

Background asteroids
Lilliana
19080426
Lilliana